Rubén Vega Fuentes (born 24 July 1977) is a Spanish retired footballer who played as an attacking midfielder, and the manager of SD Ponferradina B.

Club career
Born in Castrillo de las Piedras, Province of León, Vega's career was spent mainly in the Spanish third division, but he did amass 11 La Liga appearances over the course of two seasons, with Real Sociedad. He made his debut in the competition on 31 August 1997, playing the full 90 minutes in a 0–3 away loss against FC Barcelona.

Vega also represented Gimnástica de Torrelavega, Albacete Balompié, Sevilla FC (then in the second level), Deportivo Alavés B, Cultural y Deportiva Leonesa and SD Ponferradina. With the latter side he promoted twice to division two, but suffered the subsequent immediate relegations in 2007 and 2011.

Vega retired from football in 2012 at the age of 35, after one year out of football. He stayed connected with his last club, being appointed assistant coach under Manolo Díaz for the 2014–15 campaign.

References

External links
Ponferradina official profile 

1977 births
Living people
Sportspeople from the Province of León
Spanish footballers
Footballers from Castile and León
Association football midfielders
La Liga players
Segunda División players
Segunda División B players
Real Sociedad B footballers
Real Sociedad footballers
Gimnástica de Torrelavega footballers
Albacete Balompié players
Sevilla FC players
Deportivo Alavés B players
Cultural Leonesa footballers
SD Ponferradina players
Spanish football managers
Segunda División managers
SD Ponferradina managers